Shōnen Star was the Indonesian version of Weekly Shōnen Sunday published by Elex Media Komputindo (member of Gramedia group), the largest comic publisher in Indonesia in 2005. The magazine published Kurozakuro, Robot Boys, My Wing, Midori's Days, etc. Due to government regulation of pornography so the censorship was considered to be too strict. Formerly the magazine had been published monthly but as of July 2010 the magazine was published twice a month. In November 2013 the magazine was cancelled at volume 16.

Manga series

See also

 List of manga magazines published outside of Japan

External links
 Publisher website 

2005 establishments in Indonesia
2013 disestablishments in Indonesia
Anime and manga magazines
Biweekly magazines
Defunct magazines published in Indonesia
Indonesian comics titles
Indonesian-language magazines
Magazines established in 2005
Magazines disestablished in 2013
Monthly magazines published in Indonesia